is a Japanese voice actress who works for Aoni Production.

Filmography

Television animation
Chibi Maruko-chan (1990), Tomiko Tomita, Midori Yoshikawa, Hiromi Maeda, Maki Makimura, Yamada's mother, Yoshiko's Mother, Taguchi, Tarō, Himeko, Yoshida
Goldfish Warning! (1991), Piko, Bunta
21 Emon (1992), Girl
Super Bikkuriman (1992), Asuka/Izana Asuka
The Laughing Salesman (1992), Naoko
Aoki Densetsu Shoot! (1993), Kiyotaka Hirose, Shinobu
Dragon Ball Z (1993), Erasa, Oob
Heisei Inu Monogatari Bow (1993), Madoka
Marmalade Boy (1994), Ryouko Momoi
Mobile Suit Gundam Wing (1995), Iria Winner
Dr. Slump (1997), Peasuke Soramame
Yu-Gi-Oh! (1998), Imori
One Piece (1999), Roronoa Zoro (child), Koala's Mother
Digimon Adventure 02 (2000), Iori Hida, Armadillomon, Noriko Kawada
Atashin'chi (2002), Arisa Kohei, Bread Owner
Zatch Bell! (2003), Hyde
Planetes, (2003), Mother
Black Jack, (2005) Candy
HeartCatch PreCure! (2010), Hayato
Sakiika-kun (2011), Kusaya
Digimon Xros Wars (2011), Dracomon
World Trigger (2014), Yōtarō Rindō
Dragon Ball Kai (2015), Oob
Dragon Ball Super (2017), Oguma

Unknown date
Ghost Sweeper Mikami, Heaven Dragon Baby, Engeji
Hatara Kizzu Maihamu Gumi, Saburo
Hell Teacher Nūbē, Makoto Kurita
Cheeky Angel, Angel Wing
Dragon Ball GT, Sealer
Muka Muka Paradise, Nika Nika
Slayers NEXT, Auntie Aqua (Episode 18 only)

Film animation
Dr. Slump and Arale-chan: N-cha!! Excited Heart of Summer Vacation (1994), Mummy
Go! Go! Ackman (1994), Ackman
Crayon Shin-chan: Unkokusai's Ambition (1995), Fubukimaru Kasuga
Jigoku Sensei Nūbē (1996), Makoto Kurita
Ultimate Muscle (2002), Arenanda
One Piece: The Cursed Holy Sword (2004), Roronoa Zoro (young)
Digimon Adventure: Last Evolution Kizuna (2020), Armadimon

Video games
Graduation series (xxxx), Cindy Sakurai
Red Earth (1996), Tao, Taru's Mobstar
Jigoku Sensei Nūbē (1997), Makoto Kurita
Gotcha Force (2003), Tsutomu, Tama
Xenosaga Episode II: Jenseits von Gut und Böse (2004), Albedo Piazzola (child)

Television advertisement
Chidejika (2009–11)

Dubbing
Pinocchio - Lampwick

References

External links
 Megumi Urawa at the Seiyuu database
 

Living people
Voice actresses from Chiba Prefecture
Japanese voice actresses
20th-century Japanese actresses
21st-century Japanese actresses
Aoni Production voice actors
1965 births